Atelje 212 is a theatre located in Belgrade, Serbia.

Established in 1956 on the premises of the Borba building in front of 212 chairs, its opening play was the staging of Johann Wolfgang von Goethe's Faust directed by Mira Trailović.

History
Although the theater's official inauguration took place on 12 November 1956, various plays had already been staged throughout 1956 by the same group of individuals. The most notable such staging was the summer 1956 semi-clandestine performance of Samuel Beckett's Waiting for Godot—a play that had been banned in all Communist countries—in front of some forty people on a ramshackle makeshift stage in painter Mića Popović's private atelier. The concealed performance came on the heels of a planned Godot staging in the Belgrade Drama Theatre (BDP)—being prepared by theater director Vasilije Popović with Ljuba Tadić, Rade Marković, Bata Paskaljević, Mića Tomić, and  among the cast—getting banned one year earlier. After this makeshift performance, the troupe grew into a theater that got its home in the Borba building later that year. On 17 December 1956, Godot had a proper premiere at the new location, which was its first performance that was open to the general public in post-World War II Eastern Europe.

Right from its inception Atelje 212 became known for its avant-garde repertoire, staging playwrights such as Jean-Paul Sartre, Eugène Ionesco, Alfred Jarry, Murray Schisgal, Arthur Kopit, Jean Genet, etc.

Initially, Mira Trailović performed the assistant manager duties before assuming the manager role herself. After a few years as tenant in the Borba building, the theater moved to its new home—a building designed by Bojan Stupica on Lole Ribara Street. Over the years, the building went through several major renovations, including the addition of a retractable roof that gets opened in the summer months.

In addition to the box office revenue, Atelje 212 is financed through the City of Belgrade subsidies which, as of 2011, amount to ~€1 million. In 2016, the theater celebrated its 60th anniversary.

Atelje 212 is among the most visited theaters and most expensive in Belgrade. As of 2018, it has 34 permanent actors and actresses, and like in the past, actors from other Belgrade's theaters come to play.

See also
 List of theatres in Serbia

References

External links

 
 Atelje 212 at beograd.rs

1956 establishments in Yugoslavia
Theatres in Belgrade
Culture in Belgrade
Stari Grad, Belgrade